Hitler's Justice: The Courts of the Third Reich is a book by  that profiles cases from the Weimar Republic, Nazi Germany, and West Germany and arguing for a continuity in the German judicial system. It was first published in German in 1987, and a translation by into English was published in 1991. The translation was published by Harvard University Press.

References 

Harvard University Press books
1987 non-fiction books
History books about Nazi Germany
German-language books